Stewart Graeme Guthrie, GC (22 November 1948 – 13 November 1990) was a New Zealand Police sergeant and is the most recent Commonwealth civilian recipient of the George Cross, the highest award for conspicuous gallantry not in the face of an enemy awarded in certain Commonwealth countries. He received the award for his role in the police response to the Aramoana massacre, in which he lost his life.

Aramoana massacre

Guthrie, a New Zealand Police sergeant, and an NCO in the Armed Offenders Squad, was sole duty officer at Port Chalmers police station on 13 November 1990 when he received a report that a man was firing a weapon indiscriminately at Aramoana, a small seaside township 8 km north-east of Port Chalmers.

Sergeant Guthrie immediately went to the town and liaised with police constable Russell Anderson, who had arrived separately with the fire brigade. New Zealand police are generally unarmed, but because of the serious nature Guthrie had brought a police Smith & Wesson Model 10 revolver, and armed Anderson with a rifle belonging to a local resident, before trying to apprehend the gunman. By this time, Guthrie had learned the gunman had killed several people.

Guthrie knew the gunman, David Gray, and located him inside his house. Guthrie instructed the constable to cover the front of the house, while he took the more dangerous position at the rear of the property. During this time, Guthrie had kept his control fully informed of the latest situation. Tapes of radio conversations between him and other police who arrived at the scene revealed that he was doing his utmost to minimise the danger to his colleagues.

Gray left his house by the front entrance and went towards Anderson, but retreated through his house when challenged. Guthrie meanwhile had taken cover behind a sand dune, at the rear of a crib next-door to Gray's. He was lying with revolver in one hand and police radio in the other, and transmitted when he encountered Gray coming out of the rear of his house. Guthrie challenged the gunman, "Stop, David, or I shoot", and fired a warning shot into the air. The gunman responded by firing a series of shots, one of which struck Guthrie in the head, killing him. In all, the gunman killed thirteen people and seriously wounded two, before Special Tactics Group police shot him dead the next day.

Funeral
The funeral for Guthrie was held at St. Paul's Cathedral on 19 November 1990, with full police honours. Around 2,000 people, including 700 police officers, attended. The service and final blessing were given by the Anglican Bishop of Dunedin, the Rt Rev Dr Penny Jamieson, and he received the naval honour of the piping the side, followed by a private cremation.

Citation
The London Gazette citation appeared in a supplement to the issue of 17 February 1992, dated 18 February 1992:

See also
List of George Cross recipients

References

1948 births
1990 deaths
Deaths by firearm in New Zealand
Male murder victims
New Zealand police officers killed in the line of duty
New Zealand recipients of the George Cross
People educated at Otago Boys' High School
People from Dunedin
People from Port Chalmers
People murdered in New Zealand